A tryout is the staging of performances of a theatrical production (i.e., a play or musical) at an out-of-town venue for evaluation and possible revision before the production premieres on Broadway or the West End (i.e., the highest level of live theater in the English-speaking world).  A tryout is similar to a workshop production in that the point is to identify and eliminate embarrassing flaws before the production is put on before highly demanding New York or London audiences.  Unlike a workshop, it is usually much more developed, less rough, and close to the intended final product.  If a tryout goes well and irons out the last few bugs, then that assures the project's investors of its eventual success—namely, when the production debuts on Broadway or the West End, it will already be fully polished and more likely to receive favorable reviews and play to sold-out houses for several years, so they can recoup their investment. Conversely, tryouts enable theatrical audiences in less prestigious markets to preview potential future hits and get bragging rights that they saw those works first.

The Schubert Theatre is an example of a theatre specializing in such tryouts for Broadway.

Popular tryout locations

New Haven, Connecticut: Oklahoma!, The King and I, My Fair Lady, 1776
Philadelphia: Street Scene, Kiss Me, Kate, A Raisin in the Sun
Boston: Porgy and Bess, Follies, La Cage aux Folles, High Fidelity (musical), Moulin Rouge! (musical)
Detroit: Hello, Dolly!, Sweet Charity, Seesaw
Washington, D.C.: Show Boat, West Side Story, 42nd Street
San Diego: Rumors, Thoroughly Modern Millie, Jersey Boys
Los Angeles: Peter Pan, The Happy Time, Brighton Beach Memoirs
Seattle: Hairspray, The Light in the Piazza, Catch Me If You Can
Atlanta: Bring It On: The Musical, Tuck Everlasting (musical), The Prom (musical)
San Francisco: Wicked, Legally Blonde, A Chorus Line (2006 revival), Beautiful: The Carole King Musical

References

Stage terminology